Philip Vassar Hunter CBE (c. 1883 – ) was a British engineer and businessman. Born in 1883 in Emneth Hungate, Norfolk, he attended Wisbech Grammar School and was later educated at Faraday House, an engineering college in Charing Cross, London.

During the First World War he was the Engineering Director in the experiments and research section of the anti-submarine division of the Naval Staff and was appointed a CBE in January 1920. In the Second World War he invented the buoyant cable which contributed to the defeat of the magnetic mine. In 1933 he was president of the Institution of Electrical Engineers of which he became on honorary fellow in 1951 for "outstanding service to the electrical industry and to the institution".

He was president of the British Ice Hockey Association from 1934 to 1958 and was responsible for hiring John F "Bunny" Ahearne in 1934 as the Manager of the Great Britain national ice hockey team which went on to win the gold medal at the 1936 Winter Olympics. He died at his home in Addington, Surrey aged 73.

Footnotes

British electrical engineers
British people of World War I
British people of World War II
Ice hockey people in the United Kingdom
Commanders of the Order of the British Empire
1880s births
1956 deaths
Fellows of the Institution of Engineering and Technology
People educated at Wisbech Grammar School
People from King's Lynn and West Norfolk (district)